Lanwades Stud is a Thoroughbred racehorse ownership and breeding operation in  Newmarket, Suffolk, UK, which has bred and owned many notable horses.

References

External links

Racing stables in Newmarket
British racehorse owners and breeders
Horse farms in the United Kingdom